The Ninth Municipality (In Italian: Nona Municipalità or Municipalità 9) is one of the ten boroughs in which the Italian city of Naples is divided.

Geography
The municipality is located in the north-western suburb of the city and borders with Marano di Napoli, Quarto and Pozzuoli.

Its territory includes the zones of Guantai, Rione Traiano, La Loggetta, Torre Caracciolo and Masseria Romano.

Administrative division
The Ninth Municipality is divided into 2 quarters:

References

External links
 Municipalità 9 page on Naples website

Municipality 09